Cellocidin (2-butynediamide) is an organic chemical compound with the molecular formula C4H4O2N2. This compound was isolated from  Streptomyces chibaensis, Streptomyces reticuli and Streptomyces sp. SF-536.

Structure 
Cellocidin is an organic compound containing 4 carbon atoms, 4 hydrogen atoms, 2 oxygen atoms, and 2 nitrogen atoms. It contains one carbon-carbon triple bond between carbons 2 and 3, and two carbon-oxygen double bonds off carbon 1 and carbon 4. Cellocidin contains two identical amide groups connected together by the central carbons (carbons 2 and 3).

References 
 

Alkyne derivatives
Carboxamides